Lady Evans may refer to:

 Natalie Evans, Baroness Evans of Bowes Park (born 1975), politician
 The wife of a number of people with the title Lord Evans
 The wife of knights or baronets with the surname Evans, including
Tina Brown, wife of Sir Harold Evans